The U.P. Trail is a 1920 American silent Western film directed by Jack Conway and starring Kathlyn Williams, Roy Stewart, and Marguerite De La Motte.

Cast

References

Bibliography

External links
 
 
 

1920 films
1920 Western (genre) films
Films directed by Jack Conway
1920s English-language films
Pathé Exchange films
American black-and-white films
Films distributed by W. W. Hodkinson Corporation
Silent American Western (genre) films
1920s American films